The 1979–80 Divizia A was the sixty-second season of Divizia A, the top-level football league of Romania.

Teams

League table

Results

Top goalscorers

Champion squad

See also 

 1979–80 Divizia B
 1979–80 Divizia C
 1979–80 County Championship

References

Liga I seasons
Romania
1979–80 in Romanian football